Lha (b.697 – ?d. r. 704 – 705) was a (De facto) Tibetan Emperor who ruled briefly in 704 to 705. The circumstances of his reign are not very clear, and he is not counted in most lists of rulers.

Biography 
Lha was one of the sons of emperor Tridu Songtsen, who met a hasty end in 704. The Old Book of Tang say that the southern tributaries of the empire revolted and during the imperial military reaction, Tridu Songtsen was killed. Due to squabbling by his sons, his seven-year-old son Lha was enthroned.

Tibetan Annals from Dunhuang briefly mention that an older brother of Me Agtsom was deposed in 705. There is no information about the circumstances of his brief enthronement, or the causes of his disgrace. Possibly it had something to do with the disturbances in the southern dependencies of the empire that took place at this time. On the basis of these materials the historian Christopher Beckwith argues that Me Agtsom did not succeed his father immediately. Rather, the throne was briefly held by Lha, who was also possibly called Lha Balpho. After a short while, his powerful grandmother, the empress dowager Khri ma lod, dethroned him and placed the infant Gyal Tsugru - the future Me Agtsom - on the throne. The coup was accompanied by revolts and executions involving the vassal country Serib at the south-western border of Tibet.

Lha was apparently not killed. It has been suggested that he was the person who actually received the Princess Jincheng as his bride in 710, though this is very unclear. The princess is usually regarded as the consort of Me Agtsom.

See also

 Tibetan Empire

References

Tibetan emperors
Buddhist monarchs
8th-century rulers in Asia
Tibetan Empire
8th-century Tibetan people